The Parnelli VPJ2 is an open-wheel race car, designed by British designer and engineer Maurice Phillippe for Vel's Parnelli Jones Racing, to compete in U.S.A.C. Championship Car, between 1973 and 1974. It was driven by Jan Opperman, Mario Andretti, and Al Unser. It won two races; one for Unser at Texas, and one for Andretti at Trenton.

References

American Championship racing cars
Open wheel racing cars